Zeitz is a town in the Burgenlandkreis district, in Saxony-Anhalt, Germany. It is situated on the river White Elster, in the triangle of the federal states Saxony-Anhalt, Thuringia and Saxony.

History
Zeitz was first recorded under the name Cici in the synode of Ravenna in 967. Between 965 and 982, it was the chief fortress of the March of Zeitz. Zeitz was a bishop's residence between 968 and 1028, when it was moved to Naumburg. Beginning at the end of the 13th century, the bishops again resided in their castle at Zeitz.  The Herrmannsschacht (built in 1889) is one of the oldest brick factories in the world. The city was captured by Swedish troops during the Thirty Years' War and was given to Electorate of Saxony in 1644. It was the centre of Saxe-Zeitz between 1657 and 1718, before returning to the Electorate (which became the Kingdom of Saxony in 1806). In 1815, it was given to the Kingdom of Prussia, becoming district (kreis) centre of the Merseburg region (regierungsbezirk) of the Province of Saxony until 1944, when it became part of the Halle region. It became a county free city between 1901 and 1950. It was occupied by U.S. troops on 27 April 1945 and was transferred to Soviet control on 1 July 1945. It was a district centre in the Halle region of Saxony-Anhalt state in 1945 — 1952 and again in 1990 — 1994, and in Halle bezirk between 1952 and 1990. It lost its status as county centre and became part of the Burgenlandkreis on 1 July 1994.

A bombing target of the Oil Campaign of World War II, the Brabag plant northeast of Zeitz used lignite coal for the production of synthetic fuels – forced labor was provided by the nearby Wille subcamp of Buchenwald in Rehmsdorf and Gleina. In the middle of the 1960s work started on the "Zeitz-Ost" residential area, and in the mid-1980s, housing estates such as the "Völkerfreundschaft" were built.

On 18 August 1976, the Protestant clergyman Oskar Brüsewitz from Rippicha burnt himself to death in front of the Michaeliskirche. This was a protest against the DDR system.  
The town was an industrial centre until German Reunification made many companies in eastern Germany uncompetitive, and 20,000 people lost jobs or moved to other employment. The town still has a large sugar factory, and the nearby lignite mines (Profen and Schleenhain) and Lippendorf Power Station, together employing 2,000 people from Zeitz.

On 1 July 2009 Zeitz absorbed the former municipalities Döbris, Geußnitz, Kayna, Nonnewitz and Würchwitz. On 1 January 2010 it absorbed Luckenau and Theißen.

Geography 
The town Zeitz consists of Zeitz proper and the following Ortschaften or municipal divisions:

Geußnitz
Kayna
Luckenau
Nonnewitz
Pirkau
Theißen
Würchwitz
Zangenberg

Main sights
Zeitz sights are predominantly situated along the Romanesque Road (point 52).  
The 10th century crypt displays 17th century tin coffins including that of Moritz, Duke of Saxony.
 Michaeliskirche (1154), originally a Romanesque basilica and contains a 1517 original of Martin Luther's 95 Theses.
 Town Hall (1509, rebuilt in 1909). It is   a Gothic structure that, together with restored houses and 3 market-places, provides Zeitz' medieval appearance.
 Herrmannsschacht, a technical monument in a former brick factory.

Twin towns – sister cities

Zeitz is twinned with:
 Darkhan, Mongolia (1989)
 Detmold, Germany (1990)
 Kaliningrad, Russia (1995)
 Tosu, Japan (1998)
 Prescott, United States (2014)

Notable people

Christian August of Saxe-Zeitz (1666–1725), Archbishop of Esztergom
Anna Magdalena Bach (1701–1760), second wife of J. S. Bach
Clemens Denhardt (1852–1929), Africa explorer
Gustav Denhardt (1856–1917), African explorer
Kurt Floericke (1869–1934), natural scientist, naturalist and author 
Ewald André Dupont (1891–1956), film director and screenwriter
Walter Krüger (1892-1973), general
Heinrich Troeger (1901–1975), jurist and SPD politician
Ewald Riebschläger (1904–1993), water jumper, European Champion
Karl Walther (1905–1981), painter
Gotthard Handrick (1908–1978), fighter pilot and athlete, Olympic champion
Fritz Gödicke (1919–2009), football coach
Horst Wende (1919–1996), bandleader, arranger and composer
Heinz-Günther Lehmann (1923–2006), swimmer, European champion
Manfred Kaiser (1929–2017), footballer and coach
Rudolf Drößler (born 1934), author and science journalist
Bernd Bauchspiess (born 1939), footballer
Hans Zierold (born 1938), swimmer
Klaus Trummer (born 1945), canoeist
Jürgen Kretschmer (born 1947), canoeist
Martina Falke (born 1951), canoeist

See also
Geußnitz

References

External links

 

 
Burgenlandkreis
Oil campaign of World War II